Events from the year 1357 in Ireland.

Incumbent
Lord: Edward III

Events
 John Frowyk, Prior of the Order of St. John of Jerusalem appointed Lord Chancellor of Ireland
 Geoffrey the Baker reported that in late 1357 the Black Death took the Gaelic-Irish "unawares and annihilated them everywhere"

Births

 Art Mór Mac Murchadha Caomhánach, King of Leinster

References